The Hammer of Thor is a  tall, t-shaped, man-made rock formation, located along the Arnaud River in the Ungava Peninsula, Quebec, Canada. It was discovered in 1964 by an archaeologist who thought it was erected by Vikings. He named it "The Hammer of Thor", in reference to the hammer-wielding Thor of Norse culture.

Description
The Hammer of Thor consists of three rocks stacked on top of each other—a vertical shaft, a cross piece, and a capstone.

Discovery
The monument was discovered in 1964 by archaeologist Thomas E. Lee, during an anthropological expedition to Ungava. It had been standing for many years, and no one in the area knew who had erected it. Inuit tradition held that it predated their arrival in the area. Lee considered it to be European in appearance, and considered it to be proof that the Norse inhabited the Ungava region about a thousand years before. Lee thought it looked like a hammer and named the monument "The Hammer of Thor".

See also
Inuksuk - a man-made stone landmark or cairn, used by the Inuit, Inupiat, Kalaallit, Yupik, and other peoples of the Arctic region of North America, from Alaska to Greenland.

References

Archaeology of Canada
Buildings and structures in Nord-du-Québec
Norse colonization of North America
Viking Age in Canada
Nunavik
Megalithic monuments